Jean-Jacques Hyest (born 2 March 1943) is a former member of the Senate of France, who represented the Seine-et-Marne department.  He is a member of the Union for a Popular Movement.

References
Page on the Senate website

1943 births
Living people
People from Fontainebleau
Politicians from Île-de-France
The Republicans (France) politicians
Union for a Popular Movement politicians
Rally for the Republic politicians
French Senators of the Fifth Republic
Senators of Seine-et-Marne